White Tai (in Tai Dón, ꪼꪕꪒꪮꪙꫀ, ; in Thai language and Lao language Tai Khao; in Vietnamese language Tai Dón or Thái Trắng, in Chinese language Dai Duan) is an ethnic group of Laos, Vietnam and China. In Vietnam they are called Tai Dón or Thái Trắng and are included in the group of the Thái people, together with the Thái Đen ("Black Tai"), Thái Đỏ ("Red Tai"), Phu Thai, Tày Thanh and Thái Hàng Tổng. The group of the Thái people is the third largest of the fifty-four ethnic groups recognized by the Vietnamese government. They emigrated to Vietnam and Laos from Yunnan (China)

Geographic Distribution
There are approximately 280,000 White Tai in Vietnam (2002), 200,000 in Laos (1995) and 10,000 in Yunan province, China (1995).

History

The White Tai migrated from China to Laos several centuries ago, settling along the Red and Black Rivers.

Language
The White Tai speak a language called Tai Khao, also called Tai Dón.  It is a Tai–Kadai language.

Family
Men are the heads of White Tai households, although division of labor is nearly equal.

Religions
Animism (60%)
Theravada Buddhism (38%)
Christianity (2%)
The White Tai believe in multiple personal souls and hold ceremonies to recall those souls to strengthen their character.

References

Ethnic groups in Vietnam
Ethnic groups in Laos
Ethnic groups in China
Tai peoples